Solnechnogorsk (lit. sunny mountain town) is a town and the administrative center of Solnechnogorsky District in Moscow Oblast, Russia, located on the Moscow–St. Petersburg Highway and the Moscow–St. Petersburg railway, on the coast of Senezh Lake,  northwest from Moscow. Population: 

It was previously known as Solnechnaya Gora (until 1938).

History
Originally a village named Solnechnaya Gora, it was granted town status and renamed Solnechnogorsk in 1938. During World War II, Solnechnogorsk was briefly occupied by the German 4th Panzer Group from November 24 to December 12, 1941. It was one of the towns that was captured in the northern pincer of the attempted German encirclement of Moscow.

Administrative and municipal status
Within the framework of administrative divisions, Solnechnogorsk serves as the administrative center of Solnechnogorsky District. As an administrative division, it is, together with twenty-five rural localities, incorporated within Solnechnogorsky District as the Town of Solnechnogorsk. As a municipal division, the Town of Solnechnogorsk is incorporated within Solnechnogorsky Municipal District as Solnechnogorsk Urban Settlement.

Economy
Industry in the town is represented by a metal construction factory, a glass-works, a sports fishing business, holiday homes, sport centers, children's summer camps, and ski lodges.

Culture
There is a museum of local lore in the town. Not far from Solnechnogorsk is the estate of Shakhmatovo that once belonged to a prominent Russian poet Alexander Blok; a museum of him has been opened there.

Military
The town is the headquarters for the Main Centre for Missile Attack Warning. The Russian Ground Forces relocated the 18th Motor Rifle Brigade here from the Baltics from 1993 until the brigade was disbanded in 1998.

Notable people
The town is the birthplace of the former Soviet hockey player Viktor Shalimov.

Solnechnogorsk is the residence of producer TRIPLESIXDELETE, who's well-known in the trap-metal scene, recognized by his Russian producer tag "Делит на бите, сука".

References

Notes

Sources

Cities and towns in Moscow Oblast
Solnechnogorsky District